Maria Apolonia "Marjolein" van 't Geloof (born 27 March 1996) is a Dutch professional racing cyclist, who currently rides for UCI Women's Continental Team .

Major results

2014
 1st  Young rider classification, BeNe Ladies Tour
 2nd Road race, National Junior Road Championships
 7th Road race, UEC European Junior Road Championships
2015
 6th Omloop van de IJsseldelta
2016
 7th Erondegemse Pijl
2017
 National Track Championships
1st  Points race
2nd Scratch
 8th Dwars door de Westhoek
 8th Omloop van de IJsseldelta
 10th Road race, National Road Championships
2018
 3rd Omloop van de Westhoek - Memorial Stive Vermaut
 3rd 7-Dorpenomloop Aalburg
 4th Omloop van Borsele
 5th Erondegemse Pijl
 5th Flanders Ladies Classic
 6th Trofee Maarten Wynants
 10th Le Samyn des Dames
2019
 3rd Trofee Maarten Wynants
 8th Nokere Koerse voor Dames
2020
 8th Le Samyn des Dames
2021
 National Track Championships
1st  Madison (with Nina Kessler)
3rd Scratch
 5th Le Samyn des Dames
2022
 5th Nokere Koerse voor Dames
 6th Le Samyn des Dames
 7th Omloop der Kempen

References

External links

1996 births
Living people
Dutch female cyclists
Place of birth missing (living people)
21st-century Dutch women